Plus One is a 2019 American romantic comedy film, written, directed, and produced by Jeff Chan and Andrew Rhymer. Starring Maya Erskine, Jack Quaid, Beck Bennett, Rosalind Chao, Perrey Reeves, and Ed Begley Jr., the film follows two longtime single friends who agree to be each other's plus one at every wedding they're invited to.

The film premiered at the Tribeca Film Festival on April 28, 2019, where it won the Narrative Audience Award, and was released on June 14, 2019 by RLJE Films. It received generally positive reviews from critics.

Plot

Ben King and Alice Mori, close friends since college and now in their late twenties, attend a wedding where Alice, having recently broke up with her boyfriend Nate due to his infidelity, overindulges in alcohol and Ben helps take care of her. Ben is fixated on former classmate Jess Ramsey and hopes to establish a romantic relationship with her, but embarrasses himself when she rebuffs his attempt to kiss her because she is engaged. At the hotel, Ben and Alice both vent their frustrations of having to navigate wedding season alone, and decide to help one another by becoming each other's dates; with Alice also agreeing to help Ben meet women.

Alice uses blunt approaches to introduce Ben to various single women at the weddings, one of which culminates in Ben having a one-night-stand. However, Ben remains fixated on finding the "perfect" relationship versus casual flings. Ben goes golfing with his dad, Chuck, and learns he has asked his much younger girlfriend Gina to marry him and asks Ben to be his best man. Citing Chuck's two previous failed marriages, Ben informs his dad to take some time to think about his decision.

After another wedding, Ben and Alice are forced to share a hotel bed and Alice attempts to cuddle with Ben, making him uncomfortable. The pair attend a wedding for one of Ben's family members, and he and Alice nearly drunkenly kiss in the pool after a deep conversation. They miss the shuttle bus back to the hotel and are forced to walk, eventually cutting through a cemetery which Alice attempts to run through and she trips. As Ben helps her with the cut on her arm, they embrace and have sex. The pair awkwardly have breakfast the following day, and decide not to discuss the previous night. A number of weeks later, Ben and Alice travel to Hawaii for a destination wedding and once again embrace their mutual attraction for one another. The pair become romantically involved, and Ben also gains the approval of Alice's parents after helping to make her sister's wedding a success. Alice learns that Ben has been asked to be his dad's best man, and expresses concern as to why he didn't tell her or hasn't accepted. Ben expresses his frustrations with his dad, explaining he still feels resentment from his parents' divorce. Alice tells him that her parents remained together for her and her sister, despite clear displeasure for each other.

As Ben and Alice prepare to attend another wedding, they get into an argument over Alice forgetting the wedding gift and her nonchalant attitude frustrates Ben. At the wedding, Ben tells her he doesn't see their relationship going any further and they break up. Ben attends the remainder of weddings alone, and makes a drunken fool of himself prompting his friend Matt to intervene. After some discussion, Ben realizes his mistake and shows up a wedding Alice previously invited him to, finding that she is back with Nate. He attempts to explain himself to Alice and professes his love, but she rebukes him.

Later that night, Chuck calls Ben for a ride after taking acid during his bachelor party, and the pair reconcile with Ben finally agreeing to be his dad's best man. Ben returns home and finds Alice waiting for him. The couple profess their love and reconvene their relationship. At Chuck's wedding, Ben gives a heartfelt speech to his dad and his new stepmother Gina, while Alice joyously listens on in approval.

Cast

Production
In November 2017, it was announced Maya Erskine, Jack Quaid, Ed Begley Jr., Finn Wittrock, Rosalind Chao, Perrey Reeves, Beck Bennett and Jon Bass had joined the cast of the film, with Jeff Chan and Andrew Rhymer directing from a screenplay they wrote. Ben Stiller, Nicholas Weinstock and Jackie Cohn served as executive producers under their Red Hour Films banner. Stu Pollard and Harris McCabe from Lunacy Productions also executive produced. James Short and John Short with Inwood Road Films also served as executive producers.

Release
The film had its world premiere at the Tribeca Film Festival on April 28, 2019 and went on to win the Narrative Audience Award. Prior to, RLJE Films acquired distribution rights to the film. It was released in select theaters, VOD and Digital HD on June 14, 2019. It was released on Hulu on August 6, 2019.

Reception
The website's critical consensus reads, "Plus One reinvigorates the rom-com with an entertaining outing elevated by well-matched leads and a story that embraces and transcends genre clichés." On Metacritic the film has a weighted average score of 65 out of 100 based on 18 critics, indicating "generally favorable reviews".

Nick Schager of Variety praised Maya Erskine's performance and called the film one "genre fans won’t want to miss". Ben Kenigsberg of The New York Times said that "Every minute Erskine is not on a screen is a minute wasted", while Jon Frosch of The Hollywood Reporter called Plus One a "modest rom-com that coasts on charm and chemistry".

Peter Bradshaw of The Guardian gave the film 2 out of 5 stars and suggested that "[Plus One needs] bigger laughs and more of the big, ironic comedy that Erskine can clearly deliver". Wendy Ide of The Observer gave Plus One a 4 out of 5 rating, saying that the film is "a predictable odd-couple romance" which is "given extra zest by the fantastic on-screen chemistry of its leads".

References

External links
 

American romantic comedy films
2019 independent films
2019 romantic comedy films
Red Hour Productions films
Films produced by Ben Stiller
2010s English-language films
2010s American films